Mustafa Pasha was an Ottoman commander, born in Edirne and a paternal Uncle of Muhammad Ali of Egypt, who had fought against Russia and Napoleon's army in Egypt. He lost the Battle of Abukir in 1799. Mustafa Pasha was an ethnic Albanian.

External links 
 napoleonguide.com

Ottoman military leaders of the French Revolutionary Wars